Lisa A. Hook (born February 28, 1958) is an American technology executive who served as president and CEO of Neustar, an information and analytics services company, from 2010-2018. Under Hook’s leadership, NeuStar lost the US NPAC contract, which it had previously held for over 30 years and constituted nearly half of the company’s revenue. As a result, the company’s stock declined by 59% from 2013 to 2016. Hook held leadership positions at several Fortune 500 companies, including AOL, Time Warner and Viacom.  She also worked for venture capital firms and at the Federal Communications Commission.

Business background

Hook was named CEO of Neustar (NYSE: NSR) in October 2010. As president and  CEO, Hook led the transformation of Neustar from telecom infrastructure to information services, which was precipitated by the loss of the NPAC contract, which Neustar managed for 30 years. As a result, Neustar lost nearly half of its revenue and the stock price declined by 59% from 2013 to 2016. The business was eventually taken private through a leveraged buyout at a 29% premium. Despite this, under Hook’s leadership the Neustar’s stock appreciated just 3.9% per year, while the S&P 500 appreciated 12% annually across the same period. The company was eventually broken up and sold off for parts. Prior to serving as CEO, Hook spent two years as the company's President & Chief Operating Officer, strengthening its market position and building partnerships with content and media industries. In January 2010, The Washington Post reported that under Hook's leadership, Neustar was chosen by a consortium of Hollywood studios and technology executives to manage a system whereby consumers could access movies and other video entertainment from multiple digital devices. The venture was not successful and was later discontinued at a loss for all involved. In June 2011, Hook was the 2nd highest paid female CEO in the Washington, DC region.

From 2006 to 2007, Hook served as CEO of Sunrocket, a privately held VoIP company. From 2000 to 2004, Hook held several senior leadership positions at AOL, including president of AOL Broadband, Premium & Developer Services.  At the time of her appointment, The New York Times reported that Hook's "self-deprecating sense of humor masks an ability to solve complex business problems."

Before working at AOL, Hook was a partner at Brera Capital Partners LLC, a private equity firm focused on investing in media and telecommunications.  From 1989 to 1995, she worked at Time Warner, rising to executive vice president and chief operating officer of Time Warner Telecommunications.

Government service

In 2011, President Barack Obama named Hook to the National Security Telecommunications Advisory Committee, a group that advises the White House on national security and emergency preparedness issues with regard to telecommunication services.

From 1987 to 1989, Hook served as senior legal adviser to the chairman of the Federal Communications Commission.  She later said of this experience: "Being at the FCC in the Reagan administration was pure adrenaline.  We were highly deregulatory and changed a number of policies."

Boards 

Hook has been a Neustar director since October 2010.  In addition to Neustar, she also serves on the boards of Philip Morris International, a tobacco company, and WorldPay Inc, omni-channel payments. In the past, Hook served as senior independent director of RELX PLC and RELX NV, provider of information and analytics solutions. She also served on the boards of Covad Communications Group, Inc., Time Warner Telecom Inc., National Geographic Ventures, and Stride, Inc.

In a volunteer capacity, Hook also serves on the board of directors of Women in Cable Television (WICT), the Advisory Board of the Peggy Guggenheim Collection, vice chairman of the Corporate Fund Board of the John F. Kennedy Center for the Performing Arts, and The Ocean Foundation, a non-profit dedicated to conserving the world's oceans.  She also previously served on the board of the National Public Radio Foundation.

Awards

Hook was honored by the Dickinson School of Law and Penn State University as a 2012 Penn State Alumni Fellow for leadership in technology. In 2007, Hook was an honoree of DirectWomen, a program designed to identify, develop and support select accomplished female attorneys to become directors on the boards of U.S. companies.

Personal and family

Hook holds a bachelor’s degree from Duke University and a J.D. degree from the Dickinson School of Law.  Lisa's partner is Washington attorney Peter Gillon.  They live in Key Biscayne, Florida with her son and his two sons.  She is an avid cook and runner, and participates in the PEN/Faulkner Foundation, a charitable organization which supports the art of writing.

References

1958 births
Living people
American women chief executives
American chief operating officers
Duke University alumni
Dickinson School of Law alumni
American technology chief executives
21st-century American women